The Solo Sessions, Vol. 1 is an album by jazz pianist Bill Evans, released in 1989.

Evans recorded The Solo Sessions, Vol. 1 and Vol. 2 at the same session, on January 10, 1963 and the tracks were originally released as part of Bill Evans: The Complete Riverside Recordings in 1984.

Track listing
 "What Kind of Fool Am I?" [Take 1] (Bricusse, Newley) – 6:15
 "Medley: My Favorite Things/Easy to Love/Baubles, Bangles, & Beads" (Borodin, Wright, Forrest) – 12:30
 "When I Fall in Love" (Heyman, Young) – 3:04
 "Medley: Spartacus Love Theme/Nardis" (Alex North), (Miles Davis) – 8:40
 "Everything Happens to Me" (Adair, Dennis) – 5:44
 "April in Paris" (Duke, E. Y. Harburg) – 5:51

References

1989 albums
Bill Evans albums
Albums produced by Orrin Keepnews
Milestone Records albums
Solo piano jazz albums